Manu Manjith is an Indian lyricist and poet in Malayalam language. He is also a Homoeopath. He began his film career with the Malayalam film Ohm Shanthi Oshaana in 2014. He is a frequent collaborator of Shaan Rahman since 2014.

Filmography

As  Lyricist

As Script Writer

Other works
In 2016 he wrote the lyrics for the official theme song of Manjappada, the largest supporters group of Kerala Blasters FC. The song was performed by Shabareesh Varma while Nikhil Thomas composed the song. In 2020, the wrote two songs for the Yennum Yellow, which is an album produced by Kerala Blasters as a tribute its fans.

Awards 
Mirchi Music Awards South:
2016– Mirchi Music Awards for Best Lyricist – Jacobinte Swargarajyam -'Thiruvavani raavu'
South Indian International Movie Awards:
2018 – SIIMA Award for Best Lyricist – Godha (film) -'Aaro Nenjil'

References

External links
Profile of Manu Manjith Profile of Malayalam Lyricist Manu Manjith
Ohm Shanthi Oshana Manu Mnjith on IMDB Ohm Shanthi Oshaana
Manu Manjith on Facebook Manu Manjith
Lyricist Manu Manjith
 
1986 births
Writers from Kozhikode
Living people
Indian homeopaths 

Malayalam-language lyricists